Howard Riley (born 18 August 1938 in Wigston Magna, Leicestershire) is an English former footballer who played in the Football League for Barrow, Leicester City and Walsall.

External links
 

English footballers
England under-23 international footballers
English Football League players
Barrow A.F.C. players
Leicester City F.C. players
Walsall F.C. players
National Professional Soccer League (1967) players
Atlanta Chiefs players
1938 births
Living people
Association football midfielders
English expatriate sportspeople in the United States
Expatriate soccer players in the United States
English expatriate footballers
FA Cup Final players

• family.